The Lancaster Central School District is a New York school district including the area surrounding Lancaster, New York.  The district consists of 7 schools and for the 2015-2016 school year has a total enrollment of 5,278 students . The current Superintendent is Dr. Michael Vallely.  The school district had received national media attention due to controversy over the school's former mascot, the Lancaster Redskins.

District 
Lancaster's District Offices are located at 177 Central Avenue. The current superintendent is Michael Vallely.

District history

Former superintendents 
Previous assignment and reason for departure noted in parentheses
Joseph L. Girardi–1986-2003 (Assistant Superintendent - Oneida City School District, retired)
Thomas J. Markle–2003-2007 (Superintendent - Springville-Griffith Institute Central School District, named Superintendent of Seaford Central School District)
Edward Myszka–2007-2013 (Assistant Superintendent of Business and Support Services - Lancaster Central School District, retired)

Schools
Lancaster High School
Lancaster Middle School
William Street School
Como Park Elementary School
Court Street Elementary School
Hillview Elementary School
John A. Sciole Elementary School

Former Schools
Bowmansville Elementary School
Central Avenue Elementary School (grades K-3), Closed June 2010
Westinghouse Elementary School

References

External links
lancasterschools.org

Education in Erie County, New York
School districts in New York (state)